"" ("High on the young Rhine") is the national anthem of Liechtenstein. Written in the 1850s, it is set to the melody of the British anthem, "God Save the King/Queen", which in the 19th century had been used for a number of anthems of German-speaking nations, including those of Prussia, Bavaria, Saxony, and Switzerland.

History
The original lyrics, beginning Oberst am jungen Rhein, were written in the 1850s. The song may be grouped with the German "Rhine songs", i.e. songs that celebrate the River Rhine as part of the German national patrimony, opposing the French territorial claims on the left river bank.

The text is attributed to Jakob Josef Jauch (1802–1859). A Russian-born Swiss convert to Catholicism, Jauch studied theology in Switzerland during 1828–1832, and was consecrated as Catholic priest in 1833. He served as priest in London during 1837/8–1850. During 1852–1856, he lived in Balzers, Liechtenstein, and befriended Princess Franziska, with whom he planned a model educational institution in Balzers. Due to his progressive stance, Jauch came into conflict with the church hierarchy, and the bishop of Chur ordered him to leave Liechtenstein in 1856. If the attribution of the lyrics to Jauch is correct, the composition would likely date to Jauch's time in Balzers (1852–1856).

The lyrics were not published during Jauch's lifetime. They appeared in print, as the national anthem of Liechtenstein (Die Liechtenstein'sche National-Hymne) only after a period of oral transmission, in 1875, so that the tradition of Jauch's authorship, or the original form of his lyrics, can not be verified. The song served as Liechtenstein's unofficial, de facto national anthem from the 1870s until its official adoption in 1920.

In 1963, the text was shortened, and reference to the "German Rhine", which had been introduced in the 1920 version, was removed. Oben am jungen Rhein is the only remaining national anthem sharing the same melody with the British "God Save the King" (since the replacement of the Swiss Rufst du, mein Vaterland in 1961).

Lyrics
Usually, the first and last verses are sung.

See also

God Save the King#Use elsewhere
"Heil dir im Siegerkranz"
"Rufst du, mein Vaterland"
"Die Wacht am Rhein"

Notes

References

External links
 Liechtenstein at a glance – The National Anthem – The Portal of the Principality of Liechtenstein has a page in English about the National Anthem, while the German version of the page has an MP3 instrumental file of the anthem
 Streaming audio, lyrics and information for the Liechtenstein national anthem (archive link)
 Himnuszok – A vocal version of the Anthem, featured in "Himnuszok" website

National symbols of Liechtenstein
National anthems
German patriotic songs
European anthems
Liechtenstein songs
German-language songs
National anthem compositions in B-flat major
National anthem compositions in F major
God Save the King